Eric Camerota (born January 9, 1985) is an American Nordic combined skier.

Camerota was born in Salt Lake City, Utah, and currently residing in Park City, Utah.  His twin brother, Brett Camerota, is also a Nordic combined skier.

Competing in the 2006 Winter Olympics, he finished 39th in the large hill event at Torino, Italy.

Camerota's best finish at the FIS Nordic World Ski Championships was 25th in the 10 km individual Mass Start event at Liberec, Czech Republic in the FIS Nordic World Ski Championships 2009.

References

External links 

 

1985 births
American male Nordic combined skiers
Nordic combined skiers at the 2006 Winter Olympics
Living people
American twins
Skiers from Salt Lake City
Olympic Nordic combined skiers of the United States
Twin sportspeople